A Bullet Through the Heart (French: Une balle au cœur, Greek: Μια σφαίρα στην καρδιά), released in the United States as Devil at My Heels, is a 1966 Franco-Greek drama film directed by Jean-Daniel Pollet.

Plot 
Holding an old resentment against Montelepre, a Sicilian aristocratic family, an influential gangster named Rizzardi (Vasilis Diamantopoulos) takes possession of the palace of the last member of the family, Francesco Montelepre (Sami Frey), who he plans to kill. Stripped of his property, Francesco flees to Athens to find a witness for Rizzardi's crimes so that justice is done. Despite the help of Carla (Jenny Karezi), a nightclub singer, his search is in vain. And now Rizzardi's henchmen, led by Navarra (Spýros Fokás) are in pursuit. Fleeing from village to village, Montelepre manages to kill them one by one. Meanwhile, he finds love with Anna (Françoise Hardy), a French tourist, with whom he decides to take refuge on an island. Still, Navarra finds and pursues them. Francesco kills him, but in the exchange of gunfire, Anna is fatally wounded by a bullet. Francesco returns to Sicily to take revenge by killing Rizzardi with Rizzardi killing Francisco.

Technical sheet 
 French title: Une balle au cœur
 Greek title: Μια σφαίρα στην καρδιά (Mia sfaira stin kardia)
 Spanish title: Una bala en el corazon
 UK title: A Bullet Through the Heart
 US title: Devil at My Heels
 Story: Jean-Daniel Pollet, Pierre Kast
 Dialogue: Didier Goulard, Maurice Fabre
 Cinematographer: Alain Levent 
 Film editor: Denise de Casabianca
 Composer: Mikis Theodorakis
 Sound: Nikos Ahladis 
 Production designer: Marilena Aravantinou		
 Producer: André Lapprand
 Production: CMS - Lambessis Films
 Principal photography: May 24 - July 18, 1965
Countries: Greece (Athens, Skiros, Peloponnese), Italy (Sicily).

Cast 
 Sami Frey as Francesco Montelepre
 Françoise Hardy as Anna
 Jenny Karezi as Carla
 Spýros Fokás as Navarra
 Vasilis Diamantopoulos as Rizzardi
 Lucien Bodard as Marcopoulos

Soundtrack 

EP, Une balle au cœur, Barclay Records (70 960 M), France, 1966.
A 1: "Générique" (Mikis Theodorakis) - 3:00
A 2: "La Balle au cœur" (Mikis Theodorakis) - 1:32
B 1: "Kaimos" (Christodoulou / Mikis Theodorakis / sung by Jenny Karezi) - 2:30
B 2: "Naha dio kheria dio pathia" (Livaditis / Mikis Theodorakis / sung by Jenny Karézi) - 2:58

DVD release 
In 2020, the film was restored by Cosmodigital for La Traverse with the support of CNC. It was released on Region 2 DVD in March 2020 by Les Éditions de l'Oeil.

External links
 

1966 films
Films scored by Mikis Theodorakis
French drama films
1960s French-language films
Greek drama films
1960s French films